D. Ramirez (born Dean Marriott; 13 August 1970) is an English house producer and DJ. He has used a variety of pseudonyms including The Lisa Marie Experience (with Neil Hynde), Cordial, Finger Fest and Rambo. He has achieved five top 20 hits, and appeared on BBC Television's music programme, Top of the Pops. His highest standing in the mainstream music scene was his remix of Bodyrox's "Yeah Yeah", which earned him an Ivor Novello Award nomination.

Musical career
Ramirez is most commonly known in the world of dance music as a champion of the upbeat electro house style, but more recent times have shown a move away from electro house in to more underground techno material. He has said "I don't feel comfortable with commerciality... When people start expecting certain things of me I tend to back away".

Ramirez also owns his own record label, Slave Recordings, on which he released his own EP Nitr8. He is also known for his technical musical knowledge and hosts a musical forum on his website. 2011 has seen him release on Toolroom Records, with his D.Ramirez & Friends EP, which features collaborations with the likes of Kristoph and Robert Owens.

2017 saw D.Ramirez launch music production masterclasses to teach aspiring producers culminating in a deep-dive into sound design 

He is currently one of the music production instructors at SubBass Academy of Electronic Music.

Recordings
"(Keep on) Jumpin'" by the Lisa Marie Experience was a big hit in the UK in 1996. It reached No. 7 on the UK Singles Chart and No. 1 on the UK Dance Singles Chart.

References

External links

Living people
English electronic musicians
English DJs
English house musicians
English record producers
1970 births
Place of birth missing (living people)
Electronic dance music DJs